Michael Krešimir II was King of Croatia from 949 until his death in 969. He was a member of the Trpimirović dynasty. Michael Krešimir II was a son of Krešimir I and the younger brother of Miroslav, who preceded him as King of Croatia in 945.

Krešimir was brought to the throne by the powerful Ban Pribina, who rebelled against the former king Miroslav for having his jurisdiction restrained from some areas. The civil war eventually ended with Miroslav's death in 949 and the reign of Mihajlo began.

The Croatian kingdom reached its former glory during Michael's reign. He ravaged the Bosnian župas Uskoplje, Luka and Pleva, and eventually conquered the whole region of Bosnia that was originally lost during the reign of Miroslav. The Bosnian ban fled to Hungary, after realizing he couldn't fight back and, by 968, Michael pacified the local tribes, establishing full control.

Mihajlo and his wife Helen of Zadar had good relations with the Dalmatian cities. Helen built the royal family mausoleum in Solin where, at the end of the 19th century, an inscription of her grave was found and translated, bearing her title "Queen". She outlived Michael for 7 years.

According to historian Rudolf Horvat, Michael was a victor in a conflict with the Arab pirates near the Italian peninsula of Gargano in 969.

Mihajlo ruled until his death, and his son Stephen Držislav succeeded him.

See also 

 List of rulers of Croatia

References

External links
 
Michael Krešimir II in the book "Southeastern Europe in the Middle Ages 500-1250" by Florin Curta, Cambridge University Press
Michael Krešimir II and his wife Jelena née Madi ruled the Croatian Kingdom

Mihajlo Kresimir II
Mihajlo Kresimir II
10th-century Croatian monarchs
10th-century rulers in Europe
Trpimirović dynasty
Year of birth unknown
Mihajlo Kresimir II
Mihajlo Kresimir II
Roman Catholic monarchs
Burials at the Church of St. Mary, Solin